Podleśna  is a village in the administrative district of Gmina Dobre Miasto, within Olsztyn County, Warmian-Masurian Voivodeship, in northern Poland.

Notable residents
 August Grunau (1881–1931), German politician and Unionist

References

Villages in Olsztyn County